Kohleh may refer to:
 Kohleh 1
 Kohleh 2